Provincial Trunk Highway 16A (PTH 16A) is a provincial highway in the Canadian province of Manitoba which provides access to the town of Minnedosa. The highway is an alternate route of PTH 16 (Trans-Canada Highway's Yellowhead Highway section) and PTH 10. Like most alternate routes, it previously served as the main highway through the town.

Route Description
PTH 16A runs in concurrence with PR 262 from its southern terminus into Minnedosa, using 1st Street S.W., 3rd Avenue S.W., and Main Street within the town limits before PR 262 leaves the concurrence at 2nd Avenue S.E.

PTH 16A continues along Main Street before meeting westbound PR 355 (6th Avenue N.W.) at the north end of the town.

The speed limits for PTH 16A are as follows:
 from PTH 16/PR 262 to Minnedosa
 as the highway approaches Minnedosa's southern limits
 within the town of Minnedosa
 from PR 355 to the top of the valley
 from the top of the valley to PTH 16/PTH 10

History
Prior to 1971, PTH 16A was designated as a shared concurrence of PTH 4 and PTH 10. PR 262 was added to its current portion of the route when the Government of Manitoba implemented its secondary road system in 1966.

The Minnedosa by-pass was completed and opened to traffic in 1971, with the PTH 4/10 designation being transferred to the new highway. The old highway was re-designated as PTH 4A and kept that designation until 1977, when it was given its current number to coincide with the renumbering of Manitoba portion of the Yellowhead Highway from PTH 4 to PTH 16.

References

016A